Heineken Cup 2011 may refer to:

  2010–11 Heineken Cup competition
  2011–12 Heineken Cup competition
 2011 Heineken Cup Final, the final of the 2010–11 Heineken Cup competition